Rentiesville is a town in McIntosh County, Oklahoma, United States. It was founded in 1903 and named for William Rentie, a local landowner. It was one of 50 all-black towns in Oklahoma and one of 13 that still survives. The population was 128 at the 2010 census, an increase of 25.5 percent from 102 in 2000.

History
The Civil War Battle of Honey Springs was fought about a half mile east of present-day Rentiesville and south of Oktaha, near the county line; the Honey Springs Battlefield is on the National Register of Historic Places listings in Muskogee County, Oklahoma.  Honey Springs was Oklahoma's largest Civil War engagement.

Rentiesville was founded as an all-black town in 1903 on land owned by William Rentie and Phoebe McIntosh. The post office opened May 11, 1904, and the town became a flag stop on the Missouri-Kansas-Texas Railroad. William Rentie was the town's only lawman until 1908, when he was shot and killed by a man he had arrested for being drunk and disorderly.

In 1990, the population was 69.

Geography
Rentiesville is located at  (35.525301, -95.491950), five miles north-northeast of Checotah, a short distance east of U.S. Route 69.

The Honey Springs Battlefield is less than a mile north of town, off 11th Street.

Demographics

As of the census of 2000, there were 102 people, 42 households, and 27 families residing in the town. There were 51 housing units at an average density of 29.6 per square mile (11.4/km2). The racial makeup of the town was 64.71% African American, 27.45% White, 4.90% Native American, and 2.94% from two or more races.

There were 42 households, out of which 21.4% had children under the age of 18 living with them, 42.9% were married couples living together, 19.0% had a female householder with no husband present, and 35.7% were non-families. 31.0% of all households were made up of individuals, and 14.3% had someone living alone who was 65 years of age or older. The average household size was 2.43 and the average family size was 3.00.

In the town, the population was spread out, with 25.5% under the age of 18, 5.9% from 18 to 24, 23.5% from 25 to 44, 24.5% from 45 to 64, and 20.6% who were 65 years of age or older. The median age was 42 years. For every 100 females, there were 92.5 males. For every 100 females age 18 and over, there were 85.4 males.

The median income for a household in the town was $23,750, and the median income for a family was $31,250. Males had a median income of $6,250 versus $36,250 for females. The per capita income for the town was $21,862. There were 26.9% of families and 24.4% of the population living below the poverty line, including 24.0% of under eighteens and 23.1% of those over 64.

Notable people

 John Hope Franklin, (1915–2009) Professor Emeritus of Duke University, historian, and author of numerous books, including "From Slavery to Freedom" was born in Rentiesville. His father, B. C. Franklin, served as the second postmaster of Rentiesville.
 D.C. Minner, (1935–2008) Blues singer, was born in Rentiesville. He owned the 'Down Home Blues Club' in Rentiesville, where he and his wife Selby Minner founded the long-running annual blues festival, the 'Dusk 'til Dawn Blues Festival'.

See also
 Boley, Brooksville, Clearview, Grayson, Langston, Lima, Redbird, Summit, Taft, Tatums, Tullahassee, and Vernon, other "All-Black" settlements that were part of the Land Run of 1889.

References

Towns in McIntosh County, Oklahoma
Towns in Oklahoma
Populated places in Oklahoma established by African Americans
Pre-statehood history of Oklahoma
Populated places established in 1903
1903 establishments in Indian Territory